Ján Packa (born 25 August 1956) is the former president of the Slovak Police Force the National Police in Slovakia.

Packa joined the Sbor národní bezpečnosti (National Security Corps) in 1976. In 1982 he became Head of the Department of Traffic Protection in Bratislava. Packa assumed office in August 2006 and his term ended in 2010 when he retired.

As of 2013 he works in the Ministry of Interior of the Slovak Republic.

See also
 List of presidents of the Slovak Police Force

References

1956 births
Living people
People from Nitra
Slovak police officers